Óscar Raymundo Villa Reyes (born 15 July 1994) is a Mexican professional footballer who plays for Liga Nacional club Xelajú.

Honours
Individual
Liga de Expansión MX Golden Boot (Shared): Clausura 2022

External links
 

1994 births
Living people
Sportspeople from Hermosillo
Footballers from Sonora
Ascenso MX players
Association football forwards
Cimarrones de Sonora players
21st-century Mexican people
Mexican footballers